Tennis has been an event at the Pan American Games since the first edition in 1951, with the exception of 1971.

Currently, singles and doubles events for both men and women are contested.  Mixed doubles was contested until 1995, and a team event was held in 1991 and 1995.

Editions

Events

Medal table
Last updated after the 2019 Pan American Games

Finals

Men's singles

Women's singles

Men's doubles

Women's doubles

List of medalists

Resources
O Tênis brasileiro nos jogos Pan-Americanos. Confederação Brasileira de Tênis

References 

 
Sports at the Pan American Games
Pan American Games